Taiwanese-Japanese or Japanese-Taiwanese can refer to:

 Japan–Taiwan relations
 Japanese invasion of Taiwan (1895)
 Japanese invasion of Taiwan (1874)
 Taiwan under Japanese rule
 Taiwanese people#Taiwanese Japanese